Mobula munkiana, commonly known as the manta de monk, Munk's devil ray, pygmy devil ray, smoothtail mobula or Munk’s pygmy devil ray is a species of ray in the family Mobulidae. It is found in tropical parts of the eastern Pacific Ocean, ranging from the Gulf of California to Peru, as well as near offshore islands such as the Galapagos, Cocos, and Malpelo. Munk's devil ray was first described in 1987 by the Italian ecologist Giuseppe Notarbartolo di Sciara and named for his scientific mentor, Walter Munk.

Description
Munk's devil ray is a large fish with a horizontally flattened body, bulging eyes on the sides of its head and gill slits on the underside. On either side of its central disc it has wide, pointed pectoral fins with which it swims. A pair of fleshy lobes protrude from the front of its head, enabling it to funnel food into its mouth as it moves through the water. Its dorsal fin is small; its tail is long and slender, and does not bear a spine. The upper surface of this fish is lavender-grey to dark purplish-grey, and the underside is white, tinged with grey towards the tips of the pectoral fins. Dorsally, it is brownish to mauve-grey.
Its dorsal fin has a dark rim along the edges, and is often  a light grey in the middle.

Behaviour
Munk's devil ray is found in tropical oceanic and coastal waters. It can be found near the sea surface or the seabed, either alone, or in small groups or in schools. As it swims, water flows into its mouth and out through its gill slits, which filter out small particles and absorb oxygen from the water. It feeds mainly on mysids and other zooplankton but also on small schooling fish. Munk's devil ray has been documented to leap out of the water, either alone or in groups, performing vertical jumps, somersaults and other acrobatic manoeuvres.

Munk's devil ray is ovoviviparous, but little is known about its reproductive habits. The single developing young is at first sustained by the egg yolk and later receives nourishment from the uterine fluids in which it is immersed.

Conservation status
The International Union for Conservation of Nature rates the conservation status of Munk's devil ray as "vulnerable". This is partly because of its low fecundity, partly because it often gets caught in gillnets, and partly because its young are often accidentally caught by trawling. It is also vulnerable when near the shore, especially when it is schooling. Its migratory movements are poorly understood and may relate to differences in the temperature of surface waters.

References

External links
 

munkiana
Fish of Ecuador
Fish of Guatemala
Taxonomy articles created by Polbot